Fort Amherst, in Medway, South East England, was constructed in 1756 at the southern end of the Brompton lines of defence to protect the southeastern approaches to Chatham Dockyard and the River Medway against a French invasion. Fort Amherst is now open as a visitor attraction throughout the year with tours provided through the tunnel complex

History

The primary purpose of all the Medway fortifications was the defence of the Naval Dockyard. This was largely the result of the Raid on the Medway in 1667 when the Dutch fleet inflicted heavy damages on the dockyard. Defences were planned for the dockyard from 1708 and land was then acquired by two Acts of Parliament in 1708 and 1709. The land was surveyed in 1715 by the Duke of Marlborough. The first plan of defences was an enceinte (ring of fortifications), from Gun Wharf, Chatham, to north of the village of Brompton.

In 1755, the 'Prince of Wales' Bastion, 'Prince Williams Bastion', 'Kings Bastion', 'Prince Edwards Bastion', 'Prince Henry's Bastion' and the 'Prince Fredericks Bastion' were all built. These and the ditches, built during the Seven Years' War (1756–63), became known as the Chatham lines and were entered by four gateways with bridges.  The fortifications were designed in 1755 by Captain John Peter Desmaretze of the Board of Ordnance and consisted of a  earthwork ditch and a  parapet.

In 1757, an infantry barracks (for a troop garrison) was built to man the defences.

During the American Revolutionary War (1778–83), the lines were enhanced and strengthened. The strongpoint of the design were two Redoubts - 'Amherst' (at the southern end) and 'Townsend' (at the northern end). Amherst Redoubt later became Fort Amherst. Each was equipped with 14 42-pounders, 10 9-pounders, 8 6-pounders and 2 4-pounder guns.

In 1779, during the construction, workmen found an existing foundation of a Roman building. Several finds, including pieces of Roman brick and tile, were made. Roman coins were also found, including one of the Empress Faustina, and one of the Emperor Claudius. The finds were recorded by Rev. James Douglas, working as Lt Douglas with the Royal Engineers 'North Lincs Militia, who later wrote a book describing all of his archaeological research - Nenia Britannica.

During the Napoleonic Wars (1803–15) the Chatham defences were enlarged and considerably strengthened.  Further batteries were added (such as the Cornwallis Battery) and the ditches revetted (lined with brick), to the plans of General Hugh Debbrieg, chief engineer for Lord Amherst. Debbrieg had originally helped in the "Cumberland Lines" planning with Capt. Desmaretze. His plan for the Chatham lines, drawn by Joseph Heath and dated 1755, is kept at the British Museum.

Also in 1802–11, prisoners, mostly convicts from St Mary's Island, were set to work on extending the tunnels and creating vast underground stores and shelters, new magazines, barracks, gun batteries and guardrooms. More than 50 smooth-bore cannon were also mounted. The last building works were completed in about 1820. A maze of tunnels, used to move ammunition around the fort, were dug into the chalk cliffs.

A second gun battery, 'Townsend Redoubt', was built at the northeastern corner of the dockyard at the same time as Fort Amherst. Both forts were inside the 1756 brick-lined earthwork bastions known as the "Cumberland Lines", which surrounded the whole east side of the dockyard down to St Mary's Island. These have now been built over.

Fort Clarence in Rochester and Fort Pitt, on the Rochester-Chatham borders, were built in 1805–15 to protect the southern approaches.

Although the Lines were never put to the test, their design would have made a formidable defence against any invasion force.

In 1820, because of improvements in artillery equipment and greater firing ranges, the defences were declared obsolete. The entire fortified area was then used as a training-ground during the Victorian era, with practice sieges becoming so popular that they attracted thousands of visitors to Chatham. VIPs were seated on the Casemated Barracks that once stood in the Lower Lines and also on Prince William's Barracks within Fort Amherst itself.

One such siege is described in Charles Dickens Pickwick Papers.
Fort Amherst has been described by English Heritage as the most complete Napoleonic fortification in Britain and as such has great national historical significance.

In 1959, the site was scheduled as an ancient monument.

The fort was still in use during the Second World War when it served as an Air Raid Warning command post. It later underwent restoration to make more areas accessible to the public. An attempt was made by the Royal Engineers, to convert the Fort into a display ground for their military vehicles, as an offshoot of the Royal Engineers Museum in Gillingham, but this was prevented by a lack of finance.

Current use

In the late 1970s a group of enthusiasts were given permission by the Ministry of Defence to start tidying up the site, with the intention of restoring the fort. In 1980 the fort was purchased from the ministry by the Fort Amherst and Lines Trust and public open days began.

Fort Amherst is now managed and operated by the Fort Amherst Heritage Trust, a Registered Charity, which opens the fort to visitors every day of the year and provides daily tours at 11am and 2pm (subject to changes). The trust have also run a programme of regular events, including ghost tours, which typically take place on the first Friday evening of each month, and over-night paranormal investigations through the tunnels. Halloween tours have also taken place, where guests make their way through the dark rooms and passages.

Some of the cannons are fired on Sundays throughout the year and periodically during school holidays.

The fort was one of the filming locations for the 1986 Warner Bros. film The Mission and the 2011 film Sherlock Holmes: A Game of Shadows as well as the 2015 BBC TV adaptation of Agatha Christie's Partners in Crime.

On Sundays, during the summer 2008 season, the fort was open to the public, without charge, to promote the Great Lines Heritage Park and the proposed World Heritage Site application for Chatham Dockyard and its Defences.

In 2012 the 200th anniversary of the establishment, under Royal Warrant of the Royal Engineers at Brompton Barracks (the Royal School of Military Engineering), was marked by a team of Royal Engineers designing, building and assembling the Bicentenary Bridge. The bridge leads to a part of the fort also known as Spur Battery and to the Inner Lines - the Napoleonic defensive ditches. These parts are accessible only at special times and during guided visits.

In 2012 the fort received about 20,000 visitors.

In 2014 the main gates to Fort Amherst were refurbished by a group of Sappers from 1 Royal School of Military Engineering Regiment as part of their Class 1 Welding trade course. This was the last Welder specific Class 1 trade course.

Fort Amherst Halloween Horrors

Fort Amherst Halloween Horrors started in 1983 as a fundraiser for Fort Amherst. It is currently the oldest scare attraction in Europe, let alone the UK and is still fully run by volunteer scare actors. It is Medway's most talked about and most attended yearly event.

In 2015 it won a Scare Award for most outstanding achievement.

It is the only scare attraction in the UK that allows live scare actors to safely touch, grab and pull the public who go to the event. This is what makes it different to other scare attractions and why visitors come from all over the country to enjoy their Halloween at Fort Amherst.

A Ghastly Ghost Story:

The only year that the event didn't run was in 2020 due to Coronavirus Pandemic. Some of the actors were involved in a short film instead called "A Ghastly Ghost Story" which involves a group of irresponsible teens who decide to break into the abandoned Fort and some of them get cursed and don't make it out.

After Covid-19:

The main event came back in 2021 and was described by Scare Tour owner Michael Bolton as it's "back with a bang" and "back to the level it was" Michael Bolton described it as "intense" .

Music Videos:

Apart from in 2017 and 2020, from the year 2016, Halloween Volunteers have worked with Mill Hill Media to make a series of fun music videos, released on Halloween.

Music Videos by Fort Amherst Halloween Horrors:

2016: Don't Stop Me Now (by Queen)

2018: This Is Halloween (by Nightmare Before Christmas)

2019: Thriller (by Michael Jackson)

2021: Sweet Dreams (cover by Emily Browning)

References

External links

 Fort Amherst and Lines Trust
 Upper Fort Amherst
 Chatham's World Heritage Site application

 Fort Amherst Halloween Horrors

Forts in Medway
Napoleonic war forts in England
Fort Amherst
Fort Amherst
Fort Amherst
1756 establishments in England